Jim Knopf, nicknamed Jim Button ("Knopf" meaning "button" in German) (October 20, 1942 – October 1, 2013), was considered by many to be one of the "fathers" of shareware (so named by fellow software veteran Peter Norton). As an IBM employee, he wrote a program to help with a local church congregation. When demand for his program consumed too much of his time, he quit IBM and created Buttonware. He released his first program, PC-File (a flat file database), in late 1982 as "user supported software".  He has been quoted as saying this expression not only reflected the optional payment model, but also that comments from users drove the development of later releases.

He collaborated with PC-Talk (communications software) developer Andrew Fluegelman to adopt similar names (PC-File was originally "Easy-File"), and prices, for their initial shareware offerings; they also agreed to mention each other's products in their program's documentation. Fluegelman referred to this distribution method as "freeware".

A few months later (early 1983), Bob Wallace followed suit, coining the term "shareware" for his similarly marketed product, PC-Write, a word processor.

Knopf had a near-death experience in 1992, when his heart stopped beating briefly while experiencing a heart attack. Shortly thereafter, he sold all his business assets and retired to the Pacific Northwest.  He died on October 1, 2013, after suffering for several years from heart disease and Crohn's disease.

See also
 List of programmers
 Shareware
 Free Software

References

External links
The beginnings of shareware
Interview with Jim "Button" Knopf
An article by Jim Knopf
Article about Jim "Button" Knopf, from Dr. Dobb's Journal
Interview for the 20th anniversary of ASP

IBM employees
1942 births
2013 deaths